"Half Enough" is a song written by Reed Nielsen and Wendy Waldman, and recorded by American country music artist Lorrie Morgan.  It was released in June 1993 as the fourth and final single from her album Watch Me.  The song reached number eight on the Billboard Hot Country Singles & Tracks chart in November 1993.

Chart performance

Music video 
The music video for "Half Enough" was directed and produced by Sherman Halsey.

References

1993 singles
1992 songs
Lorrie Morgan songs
BNA Records singles
Music videos directed by Sherman Halsey
Song recordings produced by Richard Landis
Songs written by Wendy Waldman
Songs written by Reed Nielsen